The Glasgow Victoria Infirmary was a teaching hospital situated at Langside/Battlefield in the south-east of Glasgow from 1880 until 2015. It was managed by NHS Greater Glasgow and Clyde.

History
A competition was held to design a 120-bedded hospital and this attracted 46 entries from architects around the UK. Campbell Douglas & Sellars won the competition to design the new voluntary hospital for the city's South Side in 1882. Building work began in 1888 and the infirmary was officially opened on 14 February 1890. The original buildings consisted of a central administration block, a lodge and one pavilion. A nurses' home was added in the 1890s and additional pavilions were added in 1902, to a design by Harry Edward Clifford, and in 1906.

A new wing added an additional 120 beds to the hospital in 1927, another block provided a further 30 beds in 1931 and a further extension provided a further 50 beds in 1935. By 1939 the hospital had 555 beds.

Implementation of a development plan brought new laboratories, a theatre suite and teaching facilities in 1967.

After all inpatient and accident and emergency services had been transferred to the Queen Elizabeth University Hospital, the Glasgow Victoria Infirmary closed in May 2015. Housing provider Sanctuary Group then took over the 9.5-acre site in August 2016.

New Victoria Hospital
The New Victoria Hospital opened as an ambulatory care facility on a site opposite the old hospital in June 2009, and it is where all outpatient services that were previously housed at the old Victoria are now located.

References

Hospital buildings completed in 1890
Hospitals in Glasgow
Defunct hospitals in Scotland
Teaching hospitals in Scotland
Voluntary hospitals